The Škoda 105, Škoda 120 and Škoda 125 were three variations of a rear-engined, rear-wheel drive small family car that was produced by Czechoslovakian car manufacturer AZNP in Mladá Boleslav, Czechoslovakia between 1976 and 1990. Engine sizes were 1.05 and 1.2 liters respectively.

The range was face lifted in 1984 with a revised design and engine improvements, together with the introduction of a new 1.3 liter version known as the Škoda 130. The related models followed in 1987 with the Škoda 130/135/136.

All 105/120/125 and 130 models known by their Škoda internal reference as Type 742, and the later 135 and 136 models as Type 746.  In the UK, the 105/120 models were known as the Super Estelle until 1984, when the face-lifted models were called Estelle Two.

Initial design

In the early 1970s, Škoda had originally intended to produce their successor to the S100/110 as a front-engined front-wheel drive model. However, because of the lack of funding (Škoda had even applied for license in Moscow to produce their new car with a front-engine and front-wheel drive), Škoda was refused a licence and was forced to update the earlier S100/110 saloon models. The main reason Škoda was not granted a licence to produce their new car was because it would have turned out to be a thoroughly more modern car than any other car from the Soviet Union, something which the Russians wouldn't have been too happy about. At that time, most cars from the Soviet Union had either a front engine driving the rear wheels or a rear engine driving the rear wheels. There was even a front-engined front-wheel drive Škoda 105/120 prototype, which looked almost identical to the rear-engined one. Because imports were banned, Škoda would not have had the proper resources or technology to produce a front-engined car with front-wheel drive.

Introduction

The Škoda 105/120 went into production in August 1976. Despite being basically the same as the previous S100/110 under the skin, the new cars featured a lot of improvements, such as a front-mounted radiator with a thermostatic fan. The heating unit was now inside the dashboard, and the fuel tank was now underneath the rear seat. All models had much the same mechanical specification as the previous models, with a 4-speed gearbox, independent suspension at the front, worm-and-drive steering, and swing-axle rear suspension. An interesting feature found on the 105/120 was the side-hinged bonnet, which opened up like the top of a concert piano.

The Škoda 105/120 was initially available in three model forms with a choice of two engines: the 105 S and 105 L were powered by the 1046cc engine, while the 120 L was powered by the 1174cc engine. The 120 LS and 120 GLS models, which had the more powerful 1174cc engine and higher levels of equipment, joined the line-up in 1977 and 1978 respectively.

Until 1979, both 105 and 120 were equipped with 14" wheels, with 155 SR 14 tyres, just like its predecessors, S100 and 1000 MB, but since 1979, due to an increased gauge, both models were given 13" wheels with 165 SR 13 tyres for 105 S/L/GL and 120L/LS versions, and GLS versions were equipped with 175/70 R13. This update was made in order to improve road handling, stability, performances and fuel consumption.

Initial criticism

The cars were initially criticised for unpredictable handling "at the limit" but it is unlikely that most motorists would notice anything untoward under normal conditions. The cars continued to win their class with monotonous regularity on international rallies, and were increasingly popular with budget-conscious motorists across Europe. The location of the radiator at the front of the car had the advantage of cooling the engine much more efficiently on the motorway. However, because it was much more complex than in the earlier models, the cooling system was very prone to airlocks, which often led to overheating and even head gasket failure.

Improvements

The existing 105/120 lineup was joined with the 120 LS in 1977. It had a more powerful 54bhp version of the 1174cc engine from the 120 L as well as a higher equipment level. April 1978 saw the arrival of the top-spec 120 GLS as well as the 120 standard model.

In March 1981, the 105 GL was added to the lineup. It was mechanically identical to the existing 105 S and 105 L models only it featured the equipment specification of the 120 GLS model. Both the 105 GL and the 120 GLS were given black bumpers and horizontal taillights.

In November 1981, the range was supplemented by an attractive Škoda Garde coupé, which was equipped with the 1174 cc,  engine from the 120 LS and 120 GLS Saloon models. This had much improved semi-trailing arm rear suspension, and paved the way for the 130-136 models of the late 1980s. The later coupé Škoda Rapid was a facelifted version of Škoda Garde.

In November 1982, the 105 SP and 120 LE were added to the range. The 105 SP essentially a commercial version of the 105 S, having no rear seats and no glass just solid metal in the rear doors; it was only available in Czechoslovakia, sometimes used for postal delivery. The 120 LE was identical to the 120 L but with a modified top gear ratio to improve fuel economy (hence 'E' for Economic).

The Škoda 130 models followed in 1984 and introduced many improvements into the existing 105/120 range. The very first Škoda 130 models were introduced in August 1984, shortly after the earlier Škoda 105/120 models were given a mild revamp. Developed from the earlier Škoda 105/120 models (some of which continued [alongside the Škoda 130 models] in production, like the 105S, 105L, 120L, 120GL, 120LS, 120LX and 120GLS), the 130 series used a new 1289 cc engine (which produced , and which was just an enlarged version of the 1174 cc engine used in the 120 series); this 1289 cc engine also saw use in the car's successor, the Škoda Favorit.

In addition, the rear suspension was now redesigned to a semi-trailing arm layout, and the track of the car was widened to 55 inches (1395 mm). 5 speed gearboxes and "four pot" front brake disc calipers were other updates. The new models countered the earlier criticism that had been made in some quarters of tail-happy handling, with the prominent UK motoring magazine "Autocar and Motor" remarking in 1988 that the new 136 Rapid model "handles like a Porsche 911".

In 1987, with the introduction of the new Škoda Favorit, the Škoda 105/120 series was trimmed to just the 105 L, 105 SP, 120 L and 120 GL. The 125 L (which was identical to the 120 L but with a 5-speed gearbox) was added in October 1988 and was the final model to evolve from the 105/120 series.

The end of an era
From 1989 onward, production of the 105/120 series was gradually wound down as production of the Škoda Favorit progressed. Production of the 105 SP had ended in July 1988, followed by the 105 L and 120 GL in January and November 1989. The 120 L and 125 L (the last remaining models of the 120/125 series) were finally discontinued in January 1990. After a production run of fourteen years, which included a total of 1,961,295 cars (counting just the Škoda 105/120/125 series cars alone), production of the 120 L and 125 L (the last remaining models of the Škoda 120/125 series) ended in January 1990.

On October 5, 2004, a survey conducted by AUTOSALON revealed that among the 3,706,012 cars registered in the Czech Republic, 1,780,124 were Škodas. At 305,726 cars, the Škoda 120 was the largest model represented, while there were 216,857 Škoda 105 cars, which made that model the fourth most common Škoda car.

Model by model

Market differences

Britain

In the UK, the Škoda 105/120 range was sold under the name Škoda Estelle, a name created by Alan Blavins of Škoda GB's then advertising agency, Childs Greene, who were based a few blocks away from Škoda's office and showroom in Clerkenwell, London. The screen printed anodised aluminium front grille Estelle badges were designed by Alan Blavins and sourced by Jim Hubbard of Childs Greene for Škoda.  The Estelle proved popular with 120,105 cars finding homes between May 1977 and March 1990. In 1987 alone (which was three years short of the end of the cars' production run), UK Škoda dealers managed to sell 17,000 rear-engined Škodas including the Rapid Coupé despite the cars negative image, individual handling and outdated technology and serious problems with the head gasket condition. Its main selling points were its spacious interior, dependability, ease of maintenance and low asking price. Reliability was often a strong point with these cars, some of which have reached over the  point and are still running to the present day due to good maintenance. Škoda made great play in its advertising of its consistent class wins in the RAC rallies in the 1970s and 80s with the Estelle.
 
In August 2006, an Auto Express survey revealed that just 612 Škoda Estelles sold in Britain were still registered with the DVLA, which officially made it the fifth most scrapped car in Britain sold in the last 30 years - although it can be argued that much of this reduction in numbers could be attributed to mass re-exportation of the vehicles back to Eastern Europe (as was also the case with contemporary Lada vehicles of the same era) where they were worth much more, as opposed to scrappage. The four cars with a higher rate for scrappings had all finished production at least four years before the Estelle. With the Škoda Estelle being the last mass-produced rear-engined small family car in Europe, not to mention the fact it is becoming increasingly rare in the UK, prices for good examples are rising.

Special models

 105 Lux (1984–1989) - Name given to the 105 L after the 1984 model year but had otherwise the same equipment and trim as the 120 L apart from a slight difference in the headlights.
 120 LSE (1979–1987) - Same as the 120 LS plus vinyl roof, sunroof, tinted glass and stereo radio/cassette player. During the 1981-1984 period, there were no 120 LS models available only to special order.
 120 LXE (1987) - Same as the 120 LX plus sunroof, tinted glass and stereo radio/cassette player. It was only available for several months until it was replaced by the 120 L 'Five'.
 120 L Five (1987–1990) - Same as the 120 L, plus 5-speed gearbox, sunroof, front door pockets, digital clock and stereo radio/cassette player.
 Rapid 120 CE (1984) - limited edition of 90 released to celebrate Škoda's 90th anniversary, featuring golden alloy wheels and all-black paint with gold stripes along the flanks.

Finland

The 105 and the 120 sold well in Finland in the late 1970s. During the 1980s Škoda's sales in Finland took a small plummet but nothing of concern. The 105 and the 120 were imported with no tweaks except some extra options to help them get through Finland's snowy roads more easily.

Special models

 105 Super - this name was given to the later 105 S.
 120 LSX - special edition model available in 1984 to celebrate Škoda's ninetieth Anniversary.

West Germany

There was a 105 LS model available specially in West Germany, but it was not a strong seller and could not hope to compete with the leading favourites: Volkswagen Golf, Volkswagen Jetta, Opel Kadett and Ford Escort. Overall sales were predictable in Germany.

Greece

Sales of the Škoda 105/120 range in Greece were strong, though it was never able to match the success of established Western European and Japanese models. Its main selling points were its low price, ease of maintenance and spacious interior. The low price was a particular consideration during the recession of the late 1970s and early 1980s. They had a good reputation for being rugged and robust vehicles and they were considered by some drivers as "the real cars" for all possible uses and needs.

The 120 standard model was never imported in Greece. After the Škoda 105/120 models were given a mild revamp in early 1984, the whole 105/120/130 range was sold under the name Škoda Target.

By the early 1990s, it was obvious more than ever that the rear-engined range had already become a far cry from the needs of the Greek drivers. As a result, the Škoda 105/120 and 130/135/136 models rapidly disappeared from Greek roads. Since the 2000s, they became a non-existent kind on Greek roads.

Special models

 105 Sport - this name was given to the 105 S (instead of Standard), although in reality it was exactly the opposite! After 1983, the 105 S was no longer imported, meaning that there was no such thing as a "Target 105 S" available.
 120 LS / 120 GLS - Both had front door pockets, tachometer, and since 1984: 5-speed gearbox, digital clock and stereo radio/cassette player. Only the 120 GLS could be ordered with sunroof.
 Target 120 L 5-speed - Same as the 120 L, plus 5-speed gearbox, front door pockets, digital clock and stereo radio/cassette player.

New Zealand

The Škoda 105/120 was imported into New Zealand in the late 1970s and proved to be an affordable, popular and robust "no-frills" vehicle, comparing well against equivalent British imports. There was a political scandal though in the early 1980s when it was falsely reported that a batch of imported Škodas were made with Czech prison labour (such imports are forbidden under New Zealand law), but imports were allowed to continue when it was determined that the importer knew nothing about this aspect of the vehicles' construction.

The car also got a political reputation at the General Election in 1984, when a defeated National Party MP, Pat Hunt, derisively referred to his Social Credit Party opponent, Neil Morrison, who won the seat as a member of "the Crimplene suit and Škoda brigade".

Australia

The Škoda 120L was sold in Australia during the late 1970s and early 1980s though sales suffered from laws that limited numbers imported annually due to their being manufactured in Czechoslovakia which was a communist state.  Despite this the 120L received a positive response from the motoring press who acknowledged it as offering good value for money. This was the last Škoda model sold in Australia until the 2007 launch of the Škoda Octavia and Škoda Roomster. It is estimated that approximately 21 Škoda 120L's survive in Australia.

Iceland

In Iceland the Škoda 105 S and L were sold, in some numbers. The 120 was imported between 1977 - 1989, although some were registered in 1990. Around 7 Škodas in total are licensed in Iceland, most of them the 120, then 130 and only one 105. Over 30 Škodas are left in total.

See also
Škoda 130/135/136

References

External links

 Skoda Canada.Ca A Registry and Information Page for rear-engined Skodas in Canada.
 Škoda Rapid.Com Contains information mainly on the Škoda Rapid cars in Britain. In English.
 Skoda and Tatra Register Australia A register of older Skoda cars in Australia

Rear-engined vehicles
0105-120
1980s cars
Cars introduced in 1976
Rear-wheel-drive vehicles
1990s cars

pl:Škoda 742#Škoda 120